Thurston, Oregon may refer to:

Thurston, Springfield, Oregon, a former unincorporated community now a neighborhood of Springfield
 Thurston, a historic locale in Polk County
 Thurston Post Office, a former post office in Linn County

See also
Thurston (disambiguation)